Chile competed at the 2020 Summer Paralympics from 24 August to 5 September 2021.

Medalists

Archery 

Chile qualified one female archer. Mariana Zuñiga qualified by winning gold at the Pan American Championships in Monterrey, Mexico.

Athletics

Four Chilean athlete has qualified to compete at the 2020 Summer Paralympics (three women and one man).
Men's track

Women's track

Women's field

Paracanoeing

One Chilean paracanoeist has qualified to compete at the 2020 Summer Paralympics after being placed in the top five at the 2019 ICF Canoe Sprint World Championships.

Powerlifting

Swimming

Two Chilean male swimmers has qualified to compete at the 2020 Summer Paralympics via MQS.
Men

Table tennis

Two Chilean table tennis players have qualified to compete at the 2020 Summer Paralympics after winning gold medals at the 2019 Parapan American Games and one qualified via World Ranking allocation. Matias Pino was stripped off his Paralympic slot when he was convicted of a doping violation by taking octopamine in August 2019 which resulted in him losing two medals at the Parapans and his Paralympic slot was given to the United States.
Men

Women

Wheelchair tennis

Chile qualified three player entries for wheelchair tennis. Two of them qualified through the world rankings, while the other qualified under the bipartite commission invitation allocation quota.

See also
Chile at the Paralympics
Chile at the 2020 Summer Olympics

References

Nations at the 2020 Summer Paralympics
2020
2021 in Chilean sport